Bahawalpur Province is the name of a proposed province consisting of the state of Bahawalpur in Pakistan. It was recommended by the parliamentary committee on new provinces in January 2013, to be created in the southernmost region of Pakistan's Punjab province. The idea was not regarded possible as Bahawalpur lacked the infrastructure of a major city and was dependent on nearby Multan. Region of Bahawalpur was itself part of Multan province in recent history.

In 2018–2019, the National Assembly supported the idea of Bahawalpur and South Punjab becoming two new, separate provinces.

See also
 Bahawalpur (princely state)

References

Proposed provinces and territories of Pakistan
Provincial disputes in Pakistan
Regions of Punjab, Pakistan